Stronger Than Before is the twentieth studio album by British-Australian singer Olivia Newton-John. It was first released by ONJ Productions and Hallmark on 29 August 2005 in the United States, where physical copies of the album were sold exclusively in Hallmark's Cold Crown Stores until 31 October 2005. This was followed by a digital and international release through ONJ and Warner Music in March 2006. An album of inspiration and encouragement to women who have dealt with cancer, Newton-John worked with Kim Bullard, Chong Lim, and Amy Sky on the ten-song collection. 

Stronger Than Before is an album of inspiration and encouragement to women who have dealt with cancer (Newton-John herself survived breast cancer). The track "Phenomenal Woman" is based on Maya Angelou's 1978 poem and features vocal cameos from Patti LaBelle, Diahann Carroll, Beth Nielsen Chapman, Delta Goodrem, Amy Holland and Mindy Smith. The album also includes a new recording of her 1976 hit "Don't Stop Believin". The track "Can I Trust Your Arms" was composed by her daughter Chloe Rose Lattanzi as a gift for her mother. Olivia had already composed "That's All I Know for Sure" for Chloe.

Critical reception

AllMusic editor Peter Fawthrop rated the album two stars out of five. He felt that "those who relish the profundity of gift card messages may find it deeply inspiring. Everyone else could scratch off the words to some of the songs and get a kindergartner to come up with something more meaningful."

Track listing

Personnel
Performers and musicians

 Olivia Newton-John – lead vocals, backing vocals (1, 3, 5, 9)
 Chong Lim – keyboards (1, 2, 5-9), acoustic piano (1, 2, 5-9),
 Kim Bullard – keyboards (3)
 Chris Anderson – programming (4)
 Rob Wells – programming (4), string programming (4)
 Stephan Moccio – acoustic piano (10), keyboards (10), programming (10)
 Stuart Fraser – guitars (1, 2, 5-9)
 Brett Garsed – guitars (1, 2, 5-9)
 Tim Pierce – guitars (3)
 Greg Johnston – guitars (4)
 Joe Creighton – bass (1, 2, 5-8)
 Danny Dunlop – bass (3)
 Ben Robertson – acoustic bass (9)
 Angus Burchall – drums (1, 2, 5-9)
 Vinnie Colaiuta – drums (3)
 Kevin Fox – cello (10)
 Rod Davies – backing vocals (1, 5, 9)
 Lisa Edwards – backing vocals (1, 5)
 Lindsay Field – backing vocals (1, 5)
 Diahann Carroll – vocals (3)
 Beth Nielsen Chapman – vocals (3)
 Delta Goodrem – vocals (3)
 Amy Holland – vocals (3)
 Patti LaBelle – vocals (3)
 Mindy Smith – vocals (3)
 Amy Sky – backing vocals (3, 4), acoustic piano (4), string programming (4)

Strings (Tracks 1, 2 and 5–9)
 Chong Lim – string arrangements and conductor
 Sharon Draper and Blair Harris – cello
 Helen Ireland and Airlie Smart – viola 
 Imelda Baligod, Jessica Bell, Georgina Cameron, Alyssa Conrau, Sally Cooper and Holly Smart – violin

Technical
 Producers – Chong Lim (Tracks 1, 2 and 5-9); Amy Sky (Tracks 3, 4 and 10); Kim Bullard (Track 10)
 Executive producers – Teri Brown, Mark Hartley and Ann Herrick
 Engineers – Doug Brady, Haydn Buxton, Robin Gray and Forrester Savell (Tracks 1, 2 and 5–9); Kim Bullard, Shannon Forrest and Vince Pizzinga (Track 3); Chris Anderson and Greg Crichtley (Track 4); Azra Hussein and Stephan Moccio (Track 10)
 Assistant engineer (Tracks 1, 2 and 5–9) – Mick Coleman
 Recorded at The Barn (Tarzana, California); Westlake Studios (Los Angeles, California); Bingham Bend Studio (Nashville, TN); Revolution Studios (Sydney, Australia); River Studios and Allan Eaton Studios (Melbourne, Australia); Metropolis Audio (South Melbourne, Australia); Definitive Sound (Ontario, Canada); Maison de Musique (Toronto, Canada)
 Mixing – Ed Cherney (Tracks 1, 2 and 5–9); Kim Bullard (Tracks 3, 4 and 10)
 Mixed at The Barn
 Editing on Track 10 by Azra Hussein and Stephan Moccio at Maison de Musique
 Mastered by Doug Sax at The Mastering Lab (Ojai, California)
 Photography – Pamela Springsteen

Charts

Release history

References

2005 albums
Olivia Newton-John albums